Ciche  is a village in the administrative district of Gmina Czarny Dunajec, within Nowy Targ County, Lesser Poland Voivodeship, in southern Poland, close to the border with Slovakia.

The village has a population of 2,800 in 2005. Historically and ethnographically, it belongs to the Podhale region and Galicia.

References

Villages in Nowy Targ County